Kurt Anderson or Curt Andersen or variation, may refer to:

Anderson

Curt Anderson
 Curt Anderson (born 1949), American politician
 Curt Anderson (musician) (born 1984)

Kurt Anderson
 Kurt Anderson (American football) (born 1978), American football coach and former player
 Kurt Anderson (director), Martial Law (1991 film)

Andersen
 Curt Andersen, columnist for the Green Bay News-Chronicle

Kurt Andersen
 Kurt Andersen (born 1954), American novelist and radio host
 Kurt Andersen (general) (1898–2003), Luftwaffe officer

Andersson
 Curt Andersson (1937–2018), Swedish Olympic sport shooter
 Kurt Andersson (born 1939), Swedish soccer player

See also

 Anderson (disambiguation)
 Andersen
 Andersson
 Anderssen
 Curt
 Kurt (disambiguation)